The Middlesex County Academy for Allied Health and Biomedical Sciences, also known as Woodbridge Academy, is a four-year career academy and college preparatory magnet public high school located in Woodbridge Township in Middlesex County, New Jersey, United States, serving students in ninth through twelfth grades as part of the Middlesex County Vocational and Technical Schools, which serves students of many diverse cultures from all over Middlesex County. While enrolled in this high school student are able to receive college credits for classes based in allied health and biomedical sciences through Rutgers University–Newark.

As of the 2021–22 school year, the school had an enrollment of 285 students and 19.0 classroom teachers (on an FTE basis), for a student–teacher ratio of 15.0:1. There were 13 students (4.6% of enrollment) eligible for free lunch and 4 (1.4% of students) eligible for reduced-cost lunch.

Awards, recognition and rankings
The school was one of 11 in the state to be recognized in 2014 by the United States Department of Education's National Blue Ribbon Schools Program.

In its listing of "America's Best High Schools 2016", the school was ranked 31st out of 500 best high schools in the country; it was ranked 11th among all high schools in New Jersey.

Schooldigger.com ranked the school as one of 16 schools tied for first out of 381 public high schools statewide in its 2011 rankings (an increase of 256 positions from the 2010 ranking) which were based on the combined percentage of students classified as proficient or above proficient on the language arts literacy (100.0%) and mathematics (100.0%) components of the High School Proficiency Assessment (HSPA).

Academics
The major subjects of studies for four years are the following: 
English: World Literature*, US Literature I*, US Literature II*, AP English Literature and Composition*
Mathematics: Geometry*, Algebra II*, Pre-Calculus*, Statistics, AP Calculus**
Sciences: Biology*, Chemistry*, Physics*
Social Science: World History*, US History I*, AP US History*, Sociology*, Economics*
Health and Physical Education: All four years*
World Language: Spanish I*, Spanish II*, Spanish III*, Spanish IV**, AP Spanish**
Rutgers SHP Courses: Introduction to Allied Health*, Dynamics of Health Care In Society*, Medical Terminology*, Anatomy and Physiology I & II*, Scientific Principles of Nutrition, Nutrition and the Lifespan
PLTW (Project Lead The Way) Courses: Principles of Biomedical Sciences*, Human Body Systems*, Medical Interventions*, Biomedical Innovations*

- * Required Courses

- ** Must be selected to take course

Athletics
The Woodbridge Academy Hornets compete in the Greater Middlesex Conference, which operates under the supervision of the New Jersey State Interscholastic Athletic Association (NJSIAA). With 206 students in grades 10-12, the school was classified by the NJSIAA for the 2019–20 school year as Group I for most athletic competition purposes, which included schools with an enrollment of 75 to 476 students in that grade range.

Extracurricular activities
Due to the Academy's small size, clubs in school is generally limited, though some are more active than others. 
A list of clubs include:
 Key Club
 Amnesty International Chapter  
 HOSA
 Interact Club
 Ethics/Debate Club
 Music Club
 Newspaper Club
 Sports Club
 Dance Club
 Yearbook Club
 Art Club
 Science League
 Math League
 UNICEF
 GSA
 Junior State of America
 Model United Nations
 Drama Club

Science League
The school ranks consistently high on the Science League exams.

2014-2015 School Year Rankings
 Biology I Ranking: 4 out of 134
 Chemistry I Ranking: 7 out of 140
 Physics I Ranking: 13 out of 108

2011-2012 School Year Rankings
 Biology Ranking: 10 out of 143
 Chemistry Ranking: 19 out of 143
 Physics Ranking: 21 out of 143

Administration
The principal is Robert Fuller. His administration team includes the two assistant principals.

References

External links
School website
Middlesex County Vocational and Technical Schools

National Center for Educational Statistics data for the Middlesex County Vocational and Technical Schools

Magnet schools in New Jersey
Public high schools in Middlesex County, New Jersey
Woodbridge Township, New Jersey